Eugène Broerman (12 July 1861 – 7 October 1932) was a Belgian painter.

Life
He trained at the Académie Royale des Beaux-Arts in Brussels. 
His house, Antoine Delporteplein 2, Saint-Gilles, has been a protected historical monument since 1997.

Honours 
 Member of the Royal Academy of Science, Letters and Fine Arts of Belgium.
 1932: Commander of the Order of Leopold.

Works by Broerman

Notes and references

1861 births
1932 deaths
19th-century Belgian painters
19th-century Belgian male artists
20th-century Belgian painters
Members of the Royal Academy of Belgium
Académie Royale des Beaux-Arts alumni
20th-century Belgian male artists